Klim may refer to:

 Klim (surname), a list of people and fictional characters
 Klim (given name), a list of people and fictional characters
 Klim (TV series), a Russian TV show
 Klim (powdered milk), a powdered milk product
 Klim (clothing), a clothing company
 Klim, Denmark, a village
 Klim Type Foundry
 KCRN (AM), a radio station licensed to Limon, Colorado, United States, which held the call sign KLIM from 1984 to 2018

See also
 Niels Klim's Underground Travels, a satirical science-fiction/fantasy novel written by the Norwegian–Danish author Ludvig Holberg.